The Environment (Wales) Act 2016 (anaw 3) is an Act of the National Assembly for Wales that was given royal assent on 21 March 2016. It put into place the necessary legislation to enable the planning and management of the natural resources of Wales in a more sustainable, pro-active and joined-up way than was previously possible.

Parts
The Act has seven main parts:
Part 1: Sustainable management of natural resources
Part 2: Climate change
Part 3: Charges for carrier bags
Part 4: Collection and disposal of waste
Part 5: Fisheries for shellfish
Part 6: Marine licensing
Part 7: Flood & coastal erosion committee

Part 1 Sustainable management of natural resources
Part 1 of the Act lays out the approach to be taken by Wales in planning for and managing its natural capital assets and its resources at both a national and a local level in line with the statutory 'principles of sustainable management of natural resources', as defined within the Act.

Section 6 of this Part puts a duty onto public bodies and local authorities to 'maintain and enhance biodiversity' in a manner consistent with the exercising of their normal roles and functions. Whilst doing this, public authorities are also obliged to 'promote the resilience of ecosystems'. This legal duty supersedes the biodiversity duty outlined in Section 40 of the Natural Environment and Rural Communities Act 2006 which was relevant to both England and Wales. However, the obligation still applies to those public authorities in Wales to which the NERC Act duty applied. It also requires those bodies to have regard to the lists of habitats and species of 'principal importance' published as a result of Section 7 of the Environment (Wales) Act. Each public body must report at least every three years on how it is complying with the biodiversity duty.

Section 7 requires Welsh Ministers to publish and maintain lists of species and habitats in Wales that are regarded as of 'principal importance' for the purpose of maintaining and enhancing it biodiversity. This part of the Act replaces the duty outlined in Section 42 of the NERC Act 2006.

Part 2 Climate change
This part of the Act places an obligation on Welsh Ministers to reduce greenhouse gas emissions from Wales such that in the year 2050 they are at least 80% lower than baseline figures for 1990 or 1995 (dependent upon which greenhouse gas is being measured).

Part 3 Carrier bags
Part 3 of the Act empowers ministers to draw up regulations requiring certain sellers of goods to charge for carrier bags, and places an obligation on those regulations to ensure that the proceeds are directed towards charitable purposes, as defined by the Charities Act 2011.

Part 4 Collection and disposal of waste
Part 4 of the Act relates to issues surrounding the prohibition of discharge of food waste into public sewers, or by incineration, general waste collection, and a code of practice relating to this part of the Act.

Parts 5 and 6
Parts 5 of the Act relate to fisheries (particularly shellfish) and to protection of the marine environment. It creates powers for ministers to serve or revoke protection notices in European marine sites as defined in the Conservation of Habitats and Species Regulations 2010, whilst Part 6 relates to marine licensing.

Part 7 Miscellaneous
The final part of the Environment (Wales) Act 2016 relates to various issues, including the establishment and powers of the Flood and Coastal Erosion Committee for Wales, matters relating to land drainage, and to minor amendments of prior legislation relating to Natural Resources Wales.

See also
List of Acts and Measures of the National Assembly for Wales
Wildlife and Natural Environment (Scotland) Act 2011

References

External links
The Environment (Wales) Act, Part 1: Interim Guidance
Guidance for Public Authorities on Implementing the Biodiversity Duty

2016 in the environment
Acts of the National Assembly for Wales
Conservation in Wales
Conservation in the United Kingdom
Environmental law in the United Kingdom